Apollodorus was a man mentioned among the distinguished people of Nicaea by the 6th-century writer Stephanus of Byzantium.

Notes

People from Nicaea